Markaz Rif Dimashq District or Damascus Central Countryside District is a district of the Rif Dimashq Governorate in southern Syria.

Geography
Markaz Rif Dimashq is located south of the Damascus Governorate covering the southeastern outskirts of metropolitan Damascus. With most administrative buildings being located in Damascus, the district has no official administrative centre. With a population of 136,427 inhabitants, the town of Sayyidah Zaynab however is the largest city of the district.

The district was split in 2009, when the sub-district Qudsaya, located northwest of Damascus, became a district in its own rights. At the 2004 census, the remaining subdistricts had a total population of 837,804.

Sub-districts
The district of Markaz Rif Dimashq is divided into six sub-districts or nawāḥī (population as of 2004):

References

 
Districts of Rif Dimashq Governorate